Magelhaens is the name used by the International Astronomical Union for features commemorating the explorer Ferdinand Magellan.

It can refer to: 
 Magelhaens (lunar crater), a feature on the Moon
 Magelhaens A, an associated feature on the Moon
 Magelhaens (Martian crater), a feature on Mars